Sapucaia do Sul is a municipality in the state of Rio Grande do Sul, Brazil. It is located in the south of Brazil, in the region of "Vale dos Sinos".

Sapucaia do Sul is a commercial city, and some industries have been there since the 1960s. The city is crossed by BR-116, one of the most important roads in Brazil.
The coordinates of this place are -29.829, -51.144. As of 2020, the city has a population of 141,808.

One of its main touristic attractions is the Zoo Park.

References

Municipalities in Rio Grande do Sul

The cordernets of this place are -29.829, -51.144. as of 2020 they have a decent population.